Dilma Menezes Da Silva is a Brazilian-American systems software researcher known for her work in cloud computing. She holds the Ford Motor Company Design Professorship II at Texas A&M University, and is head of the Department of Computer Science and Engineering at Texas A&M.

Biography
Da Silva earned bachelor's and master's degrees from the University of São Paulo in 1986 and 1990 respectively. She completed her doctorate in 1997 from the Georgia Institute of Technology under the supervision of Karsten Schwan. She returned to the University of São Paulo as a senior lecturer in 1995, and on completion of her doctorate became an assistant professor there. In 2000 she moved to IBM Research at the Thomas J. Watson Research Center in New York, where she worked as a research staff member in IBM's Advanced Operating System Group. At IBM, her contributions included work on the file system of the K42 experimental operating system. In 2012 she moved to Qualcomm's Silicon Valley Research Center. At Qualcomm, her work was centered on cloud computing. In 2014 she returned to academia as the Ford Professor at Texas A&M, and as the new head of the Department of Computer Science and Engineering.

Awards

Da Silva became a Distinguished Member of the Association for Computing Machinery in 2011.

References

External links
Home page

Year of birth missing (living people)
Living people
Brazilian computer scientists
American computer scientists
American women computer scientists
Brazilian women computer scientists
Brazilian emigrants to the United States
University of São Paulo alumni
Georgia Tech alumni
Academic staff of the University of São Paulo
Texas A&M University faculty
American women academics
21st-century American women